Streptomyces aurantiacus is a bacterium species from the genus Streptomyces which produces aurantin, pamamycin-621, aurantimycin A, aurantimycin B, aurantimycin C, aurantimycin D, dihydronancimycin and ancimycin.

See also 
 List of Streptomyces species

References

Further reading

External links
Type strain of Streptomyces aurantiacus at BacDive -  the Bacterial Diversity Metadatabase

aurantiacus
Bacteria described in 1953